The 2013 BMW Malaysian Open was a women's tennis tournament played on outdoor hard courts. It was the fourth edition of the Malaysian Open and was an International tournament on the 2013 WTA Tour. The tournament took place from February 25 to March 3 at the new venue Royal Selangor Golf Club. This was the last time that Malaysia hosted the event, as in 2014 it will move to Hong Kong, China.

Singles main-draw entrants

Seeds

1 Rankings are as of February 18, 2013.

Other entrants
The following players received wildcards into the main draw:
  Aslina Chua 
  Bethanie Mattek-Sands 
  Anastasia Pavlyuchenkova

The following players received entry from the qualifying draw:
  Akgul Amanmuradova
  Zarina Diyas
  Luksika Kumkhum
  Nudnida Luangnam
  Chanel Simmonds
  Wang Qiang

Withdrawals
Before the tournament
  Daniela Hantuchová
  Bojana Jovanovski
  Yulia Putintseva
  Tamarine Tanasugarn
  Chan Yung-jan

Doubles main-draw entrants

Seeds

1 Rankings are as of February 18, 2013.

Other entrants
The following pairs received wildcards into the doubles main draw:
  Aslina An Ping Chua /  Yang Zi
  Yus Syazlin Nabila /  Theiviya Selvarajoo

Finals

Singles

 Karolína Plíšková defeated  Bethanie Mattek-Sands, 1–6, 7–5, 6–3

Doubles

 Shuko Aoyama /  Chang Kai-chen defeated  Janette Husárová /  Zhang Shuai, 6–7(4–7), 7–6(7–4), [14–12]

References

External links
 Official website

Malaysian Open
Malaysian Open (tennis)
2013 in Malaysian tennis